Jessie-Ann Friend was born on October 17, 1981, in Escondido, California, USA as Jessie-Ann Jo Friend. She is an actress, known for General Hospital (1963), Magic Island (1995) and Frankie Starlight (1995).

Filmography
Magic Island (1995) - Lily
Frankie Starlight (1995) - Lisa
General Hospital (1963 TV Series) - Young Karen Wexler (Cates) (1993)

External links
 

1981 births
Living people
20th-century American actresses
21st-century American women